Pierre Naville (1 February 1903 – 24 April 1993) was a French Surrealist writer and sociologist. He was a prominent member of the "Investigating Sex" group of Surrealist thinkers.

In politics, he was a Communist and then a Trotskyist, before joining the PSU. He led a career as an occupational sociologist.

Early life
Naville was born in 1903 in Paris, to a family of Swiss Protestant bankers.

Surrealist from its earliest times
In 1922 he founded the avant-garde periodical L'œuf dur (The Tough Egg) together with Philippe Soupault, François Gérard, Max Jacob, Louis Aragon and Blaise Cendrars.

He was co-editor with Benjamin Péret for the three first numbers of La Révolution Surréaliste, founded the Bureau de Recherches Surréalistes in (1924 and participated in surrealist activities with André Breton before eventually opposing Surrealism because of his political divergences from the emerging Surrealist orthodoxy.

Politics
In 1926, Naville married fellow surrealist Denise Lévy. That year he joined the French Communist Party (PCF), for which he managed the publication Clarté. He was a member of a delegation that visited Leon Trotsky in Moscow in 1927. He returned convinced by Trotsky's arguments and was expelled from the Communist Party in 1928 for deviationism. From this point onwards, he and his wife participated in the life of the French Trotskyist extreme left and notably its publications. However, he became less and less convinced by Trotsky's position, and broke with the group in 1939. He then organised attempts to create a Marxist left, devoid of Communist and Trotskyist trappings, through a publication called the Revue Internationale.

Initially passing through the PSU, Naville continued to search for a modern left in the PSG, then the UGS, before taking part in the re-establishment of the Parti Socialiste Unifié (PSU) under the Fifth Republic. He remained loyal to this party in spite of his opposition to the "realists" (Gilles Martinet, Michel Rocard) and showed total rejection of François Mitterrand.

Psycho-sociology of work
Appointed director of research at the CNRS in 1947, he worked with Georges Friedmann at the Centre d'études sociologiques, dedicating his work to the psychosociology of work, and the study of automation, industrial society, the psychology of comportment, and the strategists and theoreticians of war, notably Carl von Clausewitz. He supervised the French translation and publication of the complete works of Clausewitz.

Existentialism
He was the primary other contributor mentioned at the end of Jean-Paul Sartre's L'existentialisme est un humanisme (Existentialism is a Humanism), criticising existentialism.

Honours
The laboratory of research in social sciences and management at the University of Évry Val d'Essonne bears his name.

Works

Surrealist
Les Reines de la main gauche, 1924

Political
La Révolution et les Intellectuels, 1926
Les Jacobins noirs (Toussaint-Louverture et la Révolution de Saint-Domingue) with Cyril Lionel Robert James
La Guerre du Viêt-Nam, 1949
Le Nouveau Léviathan, 1957–1975
Trotsky Vivant, 1962
Autogestion et Planification, 1980

Sociological
De la Guerre, translated from Carl von Clausewitz with Denise Naville and Camille Rougeron
La Psychologie, science du comportement, 1942
Psychologie, marxisme, matérialisme, 1948
La Chine Future, 1952
La Vie de Travail et ses Problèmes, 1954
Essai sur la Qualification du Travail, 1956
Le Traité de Sociologie du Travail, 1961–1962
L'État entrepreneur: le cas de la régie Renault with Jean-Pierre Bardou, Philippe Brachet and Catherine Lévy, 1971
Sociologie d'Aujourd'hui, 1981

Others
Memoirs (Le Temps du surréel, 1977)

Books about Pierre Naville

Des sociologies face à Pierre Naville ou l'archipel des savoirs – Centre Pierre Naville
Les logiques de la découverte et celles de l'action par Pierre Rolle in: Pierre Naville, la passion de la connaissance – Michel Eliard, Presses universitaires de Toulouse-le-Mirail, 1996

References

External links
 Obituary by Ian Birchall

1903 births
1993 deaths
20th-century French writers
French surrealist writers
French sociologists
French communists
French socialists
French National Centre for Scientific Research scientists
French male writers